Marree railway station was located on the Central Australia Railway, and later the Marree railway line serving the small South Australian outback town of Marree.

History
Marree station opened on 7 February 1884 at what was then known as Hergott Springs as the terminus of the Central Australia Railway when it was extended from Farina. The line was extended to Coward Springs on 1 February 1888. The town and railway station were renamed as Marree in 1917. In 1891, the line was extended north to Oodnadatta, ultimately reaching Alice Springs in 1929.

On 27 July 1957, Marree became a dual-gauge junction station, when the extension of a heavy-duty standard gauge line was opened originally to convey coal from Telford Cut to Stirling North since the capacity of the flood-prone, lightly constructed narrow gauge line from Port Augusta was inadequate for tonnages required to serve the new Playford A Power Station near Port Augusta, though the extension to Marree was also justified because of the cattle traffic. The narrow gauge line south of Marree remained operational for freight traffic until the standard gauge line was completed. The narrow gauge trains north of Marree ceased when a new standard gauge line opened from Tarcoola to Alice Springs in 1980, replacing the Central Australia Railway in its role as the line to Alice Springs.  The standard gauge line remained open for a mixed goods train, though it was replaced by a goods only train in 1985.  A farewell train was operated to Marree using a set of Bluebird railcars on 9 May 1987. The line was officially closed on 10 June 1987.   
The goods platform, passenger platform, and station building are intact with the station building preserved as a museum. Two NSU class locomotives and 2 wagons have been preserved at the station under the ownership of the Marree Progress Association, while another NSU is within the township, though it is for sale and in derelict condition.

References

External links
Gallery

Disused railway stations in South Australia
Railway stations in Australia opened in 1884
Railway stations closed in 1987
Far North (South Australia)